Bogdanovia is an extinct genus of lobe-finned fish which lived during the Devonian period.

References 

Prehistoric lobe-finned fish genera
Devonian bony fish